The Women's quadruple sculls event at the 2010 South American Games was held over March 21 at 10:40.

Medalists

Records

Results

References
Final

Quadruple Scull W